Florida offers resident students the opportunity to take online high school courses.

Private virtual high schools
The list of private and public online schools in Florida include the following:
 American Nation Builders College Preparatory Academy (www.AmericanNationBuilders.org)
 Solid Rock Virtual Academy
 American High School (AmericanHighSchool.org) 
 Christian Educators Academy
 NorthStar Academy (Mississippi)
 Laurel Springs School
 Smart Horizons Career Online High School
 AIU High School
 Excel High School
 Keystone National High School
 Penn Foster
 WiloStar3D
 K12.com
 Forest Trail Academy
 Citizens High School

Public online high schools
 Osceola Virtual School
 Broward Virtual School
 Miami-Dade Virtual School
 Florida Virtual School (FLVS)

 Duval Virtual Instruction Academy
 Pasco eSchool

References

Online schools in the United States
Education in Florida